{{Infobox concert
|concert_tour_name = We Were Here/Six String Circus Tour
|image             = We_Were_Here_Tour.jpg
|image_size        = 220px
|landscape         = yes
|image_caption     = Promotional poster for the We Were Here Tour
|location          = North AmericaAustralia
|artist            = Jason Aldean
|album             = Old Boots, New Dirt|start_date        = January 14, 2016
|end_date          = October 1, 2016
|number_of_legs    = 3
|number_of_shows   = 55 in North America 3 in Australia58 total
|gross             = $25,859,760
| last_tour        = Burn It Down Tour (2014-15)
| this_tour        = We Were Here/Six String Circus Tour(2016)
| next_tour        = They Don't Know Tour  (2017)
}}

The We Were Here / Six String Circus Tour was the sixth headlining concert tour by American country music artist Jason Aldean, in support of his sixth studio album Old Boots, New Dirt''. It began on January 14, 2016 in Evansville, Indiana and ended on October 1, 2016 in Bristow, Virginia. In May 2016, the tour had its name changed to the Six String Circus Tour.

Background
The tour was first announced on October 16, 2015 though Aldean's website. Aldean will tour Australia for the first time in his career. Summer 2016 dates were announced in April 2016, and the show at Fenway Park will be co-headlined with Kid Rock. Kid Rock stole the show after going on tirade on San Francisco back up QB Colin Kaepernick during Born Free.The video has been viewed over 2 million times on YouTube and got national attention.

Opening acts
A Thousand Horses
Thomas Rhett

Setlist

"Just Gettin' Started"
"Gonna Know We Were Here"
"Take a Little Ride"
"When She Says Baby"
"Night Train"
"Big Green Tractor"
"Tattoos on This Town"
"Fly Over States"
"Tonight Looks Good On You"
Medley: "Asphalt Cowboy"/"Why"/"The Truth"/"Don't You Wanna Stay"
"The Only Way I Know"
"1994"
"Johnny Cash"
"Amarillo Sky"
"My Kinda Party"
"She's Country"
"Dirt Road Anthem"
"Hicktown"
Encore 1
"Burnin' It Down"
Encore 2
"Crazy Town"

Tour dates

Notes

References

2016 concert tours
Jason Aldean concert tours